Tsume may refer to:

 a character in the Japanese animation Wolf's Rain
 a checkmate in shogi: tsumeshogi